Daria Korobova (born 7 February 1989) is a Russian competitor in synchronized swimming. She won a gold medal in the women's team competition at the 2012 Summer Olympics
She was an eight times winner of the World Championships , seven times winner of the European Championships . Since 2020 Advisor to the President of the Federation of Synchronized Swimming , Diving and Russian Water Polo Federation . She announced her retirement in 2015 and begin working as the public manager of FC Dynamo Moscow.

She began training at the age of 7 in her home town of Elektrostal. She was originally taken to her lessons by her grandmother. She made her international debut for Russia in 2008.

References 

1989 births
Living people
Russian synchronized swimmers
Olympic synchronized swimmers of Russia
Olympic medalists in synchronized swimming
Olympic gold medalists for Russia
Synchronized swimmers at the 2012 Summer Olympics
Medalists at the 2012 Summer Olympics
World Aquatics Championships medalists in synchronised swimming
Synchronized swimmers at the 2013 World Aquatics Championships
Synchronized swimmers at the 2011 World Aquatics Championships
Synchronized swimmers at the 2009 World Aquatics Championships
Universiade medalists in synchronized swimming
Universiade gold medalists for Russia
Medalists at the 2013 Summer Universiade
People from Elektrostal
Sportspeople from Moscow Oblast
20th-century Russian women
21st-century Russian women